"Strong Heart" is the song by Japanese singer Mai Kuraki for her tenth studio album, "Over the Rainbow" (2012). It was written by Kuraki and GIORGIO 13. This song was a released as a DVD single, under the name "Strong Heart: from Mai Kuraki Premium Live One for all, All for one".

Chart performance
In Japan, "Strong Heart" entered the Japan Oricon Weekly DVD chart at number 7, selling 19,859 physical copies in its first week. This song also charted on Billboard Japan Hot 100 at number 63 without physical sales.

In Taiwan, this song entered the G-Music DVD chart at number 3.

Live performance
In 2012, she performed this song at Nippon Budokan during her live tour "Mai Kuraki Premium Live One for all, All for one".
This movie is included in the DVD.

Usage in media
This song was used as ending theme of the Japanese drama, "Hunter".

Track listings

Personnel
Mai Kuraki – vocals, backing vocals, lyrics, producer
Aika Ohno – composer
GIORGIO 13 – composer
Cybersound – composer
Daiko Nagato – producer

Charts

References

External links
Mai Kuraki Official Website

2010 singles
2010 songs
Mai Kuraki songs
Songs with lyrics by Mai Kuraki
Songs written by Aika Ohno
Song recordings produced by Daiko Nagato